Kirklees Stadium (currently known due to sponsorship as the John Smith's Stadium) is a multi-use stadium in Huddersfield in West Yorkshire, England. Since 1994, it has been the home ground of football club Huddersfield Town and rugby league side Huddersfield Giants, both of whom moved from Leeds Road.

The stadium was a venue for the Rugby League World Cup in 1995 ,2000, 2013 and 2021, in addition to the 1999 Rugby Union World Cup. It is owned by both clubs, as well as Kirklees Council. Its naming rights have passed from constructors Alfred McAlpine to pharmaceutical company Galpharm International in 2004, then to John Smith's Brewery eight years later.

Stadium
During planning and construction, the stadium was referred to as the Kirklees Stadium which is still its official name. It was built by Alfred McAlpine, designed by Populous and was awarded the RIBA Building of the Year award for 1995.

The decision to build a new stadium for Huddersfield Town and Huddersfield Giants was made in August 1992. Construction began the following year and it was completed in time for the 1994–95 season, enabling the clubs to move to their new base after 86 years at Leeds Road and 114 years at Fartown respectively, with the Rugby club sharing Leeds Road from 1992 to 1994.

When the stadium opened only the two side stands (the Riverside and Kilner Bank stands) were ready. The South Stand was opened in December 1994. Construction on the North (Panasonic) Stand began in 1996 and it was completed in 1998, bringing the overall capacity of the stadium to approximately 24,500. The estimated cost of construction was £40 million.

A ski slope will be built next to the stadium.

Ownership
Initially, the stadium was owned by a consortium made up of Kirklees Metropolitan Council, Huddersfield Town A.F.C. and Huddersfield Giants in a 40:40:20 proportion. Following the purchase of Huddersfield Town A.F.C. from the administrators in 2003, Ken Davy became chairman of both sports clubs, which were owned by companies he controls, Sporting Pride. The present ownership of the stadium is Kirklees Metropolitan Council 40%, Huddersfield Town FC 40%, and Huddersfield Giants 20%. The current Managing director of the stadium company is Gareth Davis who succeeded Ralph Rimmer in 2010. On 24 December 2009, Huddersfield Town announced that 40% of the shares owned by Huddersfield Sporting Pride would be transferred to the football club, owned by current chairman Dean Hoyle, but the deal was delayed due to a rent dispute between Davy and Hoyle. The deal was finally completed on 3 September 2013.

Sponsorship 
From 1994 until 2004 the stadium was known as the Alfred McAlpine Stadium. Alfred McAlpine had been the main construction contractor and its name was part of the payment contract for ten years. The company elected not to renew its sponsorship which was taken up by Galpharm Healthcare, leading to the new name. Individual stands are sponsored by local businesses. On 19 July 2012, it was announced that the brewery firm, Heineken had bought the sponsorship rights for the stadium using their domestic John Smith's Brewery as the beneficiary, and as such the stadium was renamed as The John Smith's Stadium on 1 August as part of a five-year deal. In December 2016, this was extended for a further five years.

Layout

North Stand
Capacity – 2,750 (seating)
The North Stand, known as the Big Red Stand for sponsorship reasons, is located behind the goal post at the north end of the ground. It has two tiers and houses 16 hospitality boxes and is completely seated. The lower tier contains temporary seats that can be removed for concerts or other events.

East Stand (Kilner Bank) 
Capacity – 7,000 (seating)
The East Stand known as the Kilner Bank Stand or the Chadwick Lawrence Stand for sponsorship reasons is a large single tier stand that runs along the side of the pitch and is completely covered seating. The stand also holds the TV gantry. It gets its name from the fact the stand is built under and partly into the large hill named Kilner Bank behind it.

South Stand
Capacity – 4,054 (seating)
The Magic Rock Brewing Stand as it is known for sponsorship reasons is an all seated stand built into a bank and is completely covered as well as having the big screen. The stand is generally the away stand for visiting fans in both football and rugby, for football, it used to be completely for away fans but it is now shared with home fans with segregation netting. From 2017–18 a new segregation system was implemented with away fans given 2,500 tickets instead of 2,000.

West Stand (Riverside)
Capacity – 10,365 (seating)
The West stand is the main stand and is known as the Core Stand for sponsorship or Riverside Stand. It has two tiers and 26 hospitality boxes and incorporates the player changing rooms, tunnel, dug out, ticket office and club shop. It takes its name from the River Colne that passes behind it, a footbridge crosses over the river to the car parks and estates behind the ground.

Events

Football
It hosted its first match on 20 August 1994 when Huddersfield Town lost 1–0 to Wycombe Wanderers in the Second Division. Only the two touchline stands had been completed, and 13,334 spectators attended. Simon Garner scored the goal for the visitors.

On 4 June 1999, it hosted England under-21 in a 2000 UEFA European Under-21 Championship qualification Group 5 match against Sweden, a 3–0 win for England.

On 20 August 2017, it held its first Premier League game, with Huddersfield's Aaron Mooy scoring the only goal of a 1–0 win over Newcastle United in front of a crowd of 24,128.

The record for a football match is 24,263 for a Premier League match between Huddersfield Town and Liverpool on 20 October 2018.

Rugby League

Rugby League World Cup matches were held at the stadium in 1995, 2000 and 2013. Seven Great Britain rugby league internationals have been held at the ground, from 1998 to 2007. Since the Great Britain team was split into home nations, it has hosted four England rugby league internationals, including a 42–0 win over Ireland in the group stage of the 2013 World Cup, in front of 24,375 spectators. It was the ground's first sell-out crowd, and its record attendance.

On 29 January 2019, it was announced that the John Smith's Stadium would play host to a quarter-final of the 2021 Rugby League World Cup.

The results of international matches are as follows;

The stadium has held semi-finals of the Challenge Cup and the finals of the now defunct Regal Trophy competition were held there in 1995 and 1996. Wigan Warriors won on both occasions. The stadium has also hosted three of Bradford Bulls' World Club Challenge matches, from 2002 to 2006. The Huddersfield Giants attendance record at the venue stands at 15,629 for a match against rivals Leeds Rhinos on 10 February 2008.

Rugby Union
Despite Huddersfield not being a strong rugby union area, the stadium has been used for four full cap international rugby union matches. It hosted three qualifying matches for the 1999 Rugby World Cup and one match in the pool.  Two of the matches saw teams pass 100 points: England beat the Netherlands 110–0 in a qualifier and New Zealand defeated Italy 101–3 in the pool.

Concerts
The first concerts at the stadium were on 25 and 26 July 1995 by American band R.E.M., attended by around 80,000 people and providing a £3 million boom to local businesses. The Eagles, Bryan Adams and The Beautiful South also performed there in the 1990s, followed four years later by Bon Jovi in June 2001.

After three years with no performances, Blue played at the stadium on the 31 July 2004 with Girls Aloud and Darius supporting, in an event to reveal Galpharm's new sponsorship of the venue. The following two summers, Elton John and Lulu in 2005, and Bryan Adams again in 2006, performed. After a gap of twelve years, Little Mix were booked to perform in July 2018 followed by Take That in June 2019. Green Day, Weezer and Fall Out Boy in June 2022, a gig that was delayed by 2 years postponement due to COVID Pandemic.

References

External links

 

Football venues in England
Huddersfield Town A.F.C.
Rugby league stadiums in England
Huddersfield Giants
Rugby union stadiums in England
Rugby League World Cup stadiums
Rugby World Cup stadiums
Sports venues in Huddersfield
Sports venues completed in 1994
Premier League venues
1994 establishments in England